Badlapur is a constituency of the Uttar Pradesh Legislative Assembly covering the city of Badlapur in the Jaunpur district of Uttar Pradesh, India.
Badlapur is one of five assembly constituencies in the Jaunpur Lok Sabha constituency. Since 2008, this assembly constituency is numbered 364 amongst 403 constituencies.

Members of Legislative Assembly

Election results

2022

2017
Bharatiya Janta Party candidate Ramesh Chandra Mishra won in 2017 Uttar Pradesh Legislative Elections by defeating Bahujan Samaj Party candidate Lalji Yadav by a margin of 2,372 votes.

See also 
 Garwara Assembly constituency

References

External links
 

Assembly constituencies of Uttar Pradesh
Politics of Jaunpur district